Srednekhozyatovo (Urta Xäjät) is a rural locality (a village) in Shingak-Kulsky Selsoviet, Chishminsky District, Bashkortostan, Russia. The population was 202 as of 2010. There are 3 streets.

Geography 
Srednekhozyatovo is located 22 km southwest of Chishmy (the district's administrative centre) by road. Udryak is the nearest rural locality.

References 

Rural localities in Chishminsky District